Doudeauville is a commune in the Pas-de-Calais department in the Hauts-de-France region of France.

Geography

Population

Places of interest
 The church of St. Bertulphe, dating from the 16th century.
 Vestiges of a 12th-century  abbey destroyed in 1543 by the English.
 Evidence of 2 feudal mottes and a castle.
 Several 17th-century buildings: A presbytery, a manorhouse and cob-built houses.
 An 18th-century watermill.

See also
Communes of the Pas-de-Calais department

References

Communes of Pas-de-Calais